Arthur J. Willis was an American football coach.  He was the third head football coach at Prairie View A&M University in Prairie View, Texas and he held that position for the 1930 season.  His record at Prairie View was 8–3.

References

Year of birth missing
Year of death missing
Prairie View A&M Panthers football coaches